Bokya Satbande is a 2009 Marathi film directed by Raj Pendurkar and produced by Kanchan Satpute of Checkmate fame. The film is based on the book series of the same name written by Dilip Prabhavalkar. The film chronicles the adventures of a young ten-year-old boy called Bokya.

Bokya is played by Aryan Narvekar, son of actor Sanjay Narvekar.  The music is composed by Shailendra Barve  who has also composed music for Taare Zameen Par and lyrics are written by Jitendra Joshi. The songs are sung by Avadhoot Gupte and Suresh Wadkar.

Cast
 Aryan Narvekar as Bokya/Chinmayanand Satbande
 Dilip Prabhawalkar as Mr. Belwande
 Jyoti Subhash as Indira Satbande (Bokya's grandmother)
 Vijay Kenkre as Pradeep Satbande (Bokya's father)
 Shubhangi Gokhale as Vaishali Satbande (Bokya's mother)
 Chitra Navathe 
 Madhavi Juvekar as maid
 Alok Rajwade as Vijay Satbande (Bokya's elder brother)
 Nisha Satpute
 Anjali Bhagwat in guest appearance

Music
The songs featured in the film are as enlisted below.
 "Bokya Satbande" - Singer: Avdhoot Gupte 
 "Man Aakashache" - Singer: Suresh Wadkar 
 "Thodi Style Pahije" -Singer: Avdhoot Gupte

References

2009 films
2000s Marathi-language films